Mazraat Beit Jen, also known as Mazraat Beit Jinn or Mazraat Bayt Jinn, is a Syrian village in the Qatana District of the Rif Dimashq Governorate. According to the Syria Central Bureau of Statistics (CBS), Mazraat Beit Jen had a population of 5,073 in the 2004 census.

Nearby localities include Beit Jinn to the west, Arnah to the northwest, Darbal to the north, Hinah to the north-northeast, Maghar al-Mir to the east, Harfa to the south, and Hader to the southwest.

References

External links

Populated places in Qatana District